The Andhra Pradesh Public Service Commission (APPSC) was formed when the state of Andhra Pradesh formed on 1 November 1956.  Earlier, the commission was known as the Andhra Service Commission (formed in 1953) which is based on the regulations of Madras Public Service Commission. Later in 1956, APPSC was formed by merging the Andhra Public Service Commission and Hyderabad Public Service Commissions.

History 
On the eve of the formation of Andhra Pradesh Public Service Commission, Andhra Public Service Commission was functioning with a Chairman and two Members and Hyderabad Public Service Commission was functioning with one Member. Hence, A.P. Public Service Commission was constituted with a Chairman and 3 Members. With increasing workload, Government enhanced the strength of the Commission to Chairman and 5 Members in the year 1981 and later to Chairman and 7 Members in the year 1983. The government again reviewed the strength in 1994 and enhanced it to Chairman and 9 Members. This is the present strength also.
After the bifurcation of Andhra Pradesh  in accordance to the Andhra Pradesh Reorganisation Act, 2014 the Head quarters of PSC was shifted from Telangana to Vijayawada.

Present Chairman 
The present Chairman of Andhra Pradesh Public Service Commission is Damodar Goutam Sawang, IPS.

Active recruitments 

 Junior assistant (JACA) in Revenue Department
 Assistant Engineers in various Engineering Sub Services
 District Public Relations Officer in AP Information Services
 Horticulture Officer A.P Horticulture Service
 Telugu Reporters in A.P Legislature Service
 Lecturers/ Assistant Professors (AYURVEDA) IN Dr.Nrs Gac in AYUSH Department
 Lecturers/ Assistant Professors in Homoeo in AYUSH Department
 Medical Officer ( Ayurveda) in AYUSH department
 Medical Officer ( Homoeopathy) in AYUSH department
 Medical Officer ( Unani) in AYUSH department

Duties and functions 
Widely known as APPSC which is a part of the Andhra Pradesh government.
The Public Service Commissions had been established under Article 315 of the Constitution of India. The functions of the Commission are enumerated in Article 320 of the Constitution.

The statutory functions of the Commission are as follows 
Direct Recruitment (Article 320 (1))
Recruitment by transfer (Article 320(3)(b))
Statutory rules relating to services (Article 320 (3)(a) and (b))
Disciplinary cases (Article 320 (3)(c) and regulations 17 (1)(a) to (e))
Reimbursement of legal expenses (Article 320 (3)(d))
Wound and extraordinary pension cases (Article 320 (3)(e))

Commission is entrusted with the following items of work 
Conduct of departmental tests for several departments
Conduct of examination for admission to RIMC, Dehradun.
Conduct of half yearly examination for IAS and IPS Officers and proficiency tests for AIS Officers.
Watching of temporary appointments exceeding 3 months and according to concurrence for their continuance (regulation 16)
Consultation in cases of appointment of contract extending over 5 years (regulation 16).

See also 
 Telangana State Public Service Commission
 Union Public Service Commission
 Staff Selection Commission
 List of Public service commissions in India

References

External links 
 Official website of the APPSC

State agencies of Andhra Pradesh
State public service commissions of India
1956 establishments in Andhra Pradesh
Government agencies established in 1956